Ciarán Maher (1962 - 10 December 2012) was an Irish Gaelic footballer who played as a right corner-forward at senior level for the Dublin county team.

Maher made his first appearance for the team during the 1983 championship and was a regular member of the extended panel for just two seasons. During that time he won one All-Ireland medal on the field of play.

At club level Maher was a three-time county club championship medalist with Shannon Blues in Boston. He began his club career with Ballyboden St Enda's.

References

1962 births
2012 deaths
Ballyboden St Enda's Gaelic footballers
Businesspeople from County Dublin
Deaths in Massachusetts
Dublin inter-county Gaelic footballers
Gaelic football forwards
Gaelic football in Massachusetts
Irish expatriate sportspeople in the United States
Winners of one All-Ireland medal (Gaelic football)